Discharge are an English hardcore punk band from Stoke-on-Trent. Formed in early 1977, the group originally featured a lineup of vocalist Terry "Tezz" Roberts, guitarists Roy "Rainy" Wainwright and Tony "Bones" Roberts, bassist Nigel Bamford and drummer Tony "Acko" Atkinson. The band's current lineup features Rainy on bass (a constant member, save for the group's 1991–99 reunion), Bones on guitar (who originally left in 1982 and rejoined in 2001), Tezz on guitar (the band's drummer from 1977 to 1980 and 2001 to 2006, before rejoining in 2014), drummer Dave "Proper Caution" Bridgwood (since 2006) and vocalist Jeff "JJ" Janiak (since 2014).

History

1977–1987
Discharge were originally formed in early 1977 by vocalist Terry "Tezz" Roberts and guitarist Roy "Rainy" Wainwright, with second guitarist Tony "Bones" Roberts (Tezz's younger brother), bassist Nigel Bamford and drummer Tony "Acko" Atkinson. Acko left the band after the recording of their first string of demos between March and June, with Tezz switching to drums, Rainy taking over from Bamford on bass, and roadie Kelvin "Cal" Morris joining as vocalist. After signing with local label Clay Records and releasing their first three EPs – Realities of War, Fight Back and Decontrol – the group lost another founding member as Tezz departed, who later explained that "we weren't refining [our sound] fast enough for my liking", adding "I had other plans... I wanted to play with as many bands as I possibly could."

With new drummer Dave "Bambi" Ellesmere, the band issued their fourth EP Why in 1981, before Garry Maloney took over in the summer in time for recording of their fifth, Never Again. After one final single, "State Violence State Control", Bones also left in late 1982 claiming that the band members "weren't getting along" and that Cal and Maloney were "letting [the band's growth] go to their heads". The guitarist went on to form Broken Bones with brother Tezz. He was replaced in Discharge by Peter "Pooch" Purtill, who is credited for introducing elements of heavy metal music into the band's sound. After releasing Warning: Her Majesty's Government Can Seriously Damage Your Health, "The Price of Silence" and "The More I See" with Pooch, both he and Maloney left Discharge in the summer of 1984.

Pooch and Maloney were replaced by Leslie "The Mole" Hunt and Micky "Heymaker" Gibson, respectively, who performed on 1985's "Ignorance" before leaving again. With guitarist Stephen "Fish" Brookes and returning drummer Maloney, Discharge finally issued their second album Grave New World the following year. The album was critically panned, with Classic Rock writer Sleazegrinder calling it "fucking horrible". Rainy, the last remaining original member, left before the album's release, with Nick Bushell taking his place for the subsequent tour. After the tour, the band was left with no early members as Cal also quit. Wrathchild frontman Rob "Rocky Shades" Barclay briefly joined the band in his place, rehearsing for a planned run of shows. In early 1987, however, the group disbanded.

From 1991
In 1991, Kelvin "Cal" Morris and Garry Maloney reformed Discharge, adding new guitarist Andy Green and bassist Anthony "Jake" Morgan. The new lineup issued two studio albums – Massacre Divine in 1991 and Shootin' Up the World in 1993. A second reunion followed in the summer of 2001, when the 1977–80 lineup of Cal, guitarist Tony "Bones" Roberts, bassist Roy "Rainy" Wainwright and drummer Terry "Tezz" Roberts recorded a self-titled album released the next year. Speaking about the decision to reform, Tezz explained that "The truth is, that awful metal thing Discharge turned into was a big reason for coming back. We just had to do another record, we couldn't let Discharge go down like that." In 2003, Cal was replaced by Varukers frontman Anthony "Rat" Martin, after refusing to go on tour.

Tezz left in 2006, with Dave "Proper Caution" Bridgwood taking his place in time for the recording of Disensitise. After a string of singles and EPs, including a split release with Off with Their Heads in 2011, Martin was replaced in 2014 by Broken Bones vocalist Jeff "JJ" Janiak. At the same time, bandmate Tezz returned for his third spell in Discharge, this time on guitar. In 2015, Discharge signed with Nuclear Blast, who issued the band's first studio album in eight years, End of Days, the following year.

Members

Current

Former

Timeline

Lineups

References

Footnotes

Discharge